Thorunna furtiva is a species of sea slug, a dorid nudibranch, a shell-less marine gastropod mollusk in the family Chromodorididae. It is the type species of the genus Thorunna.

Distribution 
This species was described from Camiguin, Luzon, the Philippines. It has been reported throughout the western tropical Indo-Pacific Ocean.

Description
Thorunna furtiva has a white mantle with a thin orange-yellow line at the edge.

Ecology

References

External links
 

Chromodorididae
Gastropods described in 1878